John Van Hoek (born 11 December 1952) is an Australian judoka. He competed in the men's half-middleweight event at the 1976 Summer Olympics.

References

External links
 

1952 births
Living people
Australian male judoka
Olympic judoka of Australia
Judoka at the 1976 Summer Olympics
Place of birth missing (living people)